Antigua and Barbuda competed at the 2019 Pan American Games in Lima, Peru from July 26 to August 11, 2019.

The Antigua and Barbuda team consisted of nine athletes across five sports. This marked a decrease of one from the last edition of the games in 2015. During the opening ceremony of the games, sailor Jalese Gordon carried the flag of the country as part of the parade of nations.

Competitors
The following is the list of number of competitors (per gender) participating at the games per sport/discipline.

Medalists
The following competitors from Antigua and Barbuda won medals at the games. In the by discipline sections below, medalists' names are bolded.

|  style="text-align:left; vertical-align:top;"|

|  style="text-align:left; width:22%; vertical-align:top;"|

Athletics (track and field)

Antigua and Barbuda qualified two athletes (one per gender). Both Priscilla Frederick and Cejhae Greene would go onto win medals in their respective events. Frederick would match her performance from four years prior in Toronto.

Key
Note–Ranks given for track events are for the entire round
Q = Qualified for the next round directly
SB = Seasonal best

Track event
Men

Field event
Women

Boxing

Antigua and Barbuda qualified one male boxer. Alston Ryan would go onto win a bronze medal.

Men

Sailing

Antigua and Barbuda qualified one male sailor (kites). The country later received two universality spots in the laser events.

Key
DNF= Do not finish
STP = Standard penalty
UFD = U flag disqualification

Swimming

Antigua and Barbuda received two universality spots in swimming to enter one man and one woman.

Tennis

Antigua and Barbuda received one wildcard to enter a male singles competitor.

Men

See also
Antigua and Barbuda at the 2020 Summer Olympics

References

Nations at the 2019 Pan American Games
2019
P